Survivor guilt or survivor's guilt; also called survivor syndrome or survivor's syndrome and survivor disorder or survivor's disorder is a mental condition that occurs when a person believes they have done something wrong by surviving a traumatic or tragic event when others did not.

The experience and manifestation of survivor's guilt will depend on an individual's psychological profile. When the Diagnostic and Statistical Manual of Mental Disorders IV (DSM-IV) was published, survivor guilt was removed as a recognized specific diagnosis, and redefined as a significant symptom of post-traumatic stress disorder (PTSD).

History

Survivor guilt was first identified during the 1960s. Several therapists recognized similar if not identical conditions among Holocaust survivors. Similar signs and symptoms have been recognized in survivors of traumatic situations including combat, natural disasters, terrorist attacks, air-crashes and wide-ranging job layoffs. A variant form has been found among rescue and emergency services personnel who blame themselves for doing too little to help those in danger, and among therapists, who may feel a form of guilt in the face of their patients' suffering.

Stephen Joseph, a psychologist at the University of Warwick, has studied the survivors of the capsizing of the MS Herald of Free Enterprise which killed 193 of the 459 passengers. His studies showed that 60 percent of the survivors suffered from survivor guilt. Joseph went on to say:

Sufferers sometimes blame themselves for the deaths of others, including those who died while rescuing the survivor or whom the survivor tried unsuccessfully to save.

Survivor syndrome

Survivor syndrome, also known as concentration camp syndrome (or KZ syndrome on account of the German term ), are terms which have been used to describe the reactions and behaviors of people who have survived massive and adverse events, such as the Holocaust, or the Rape of Nanjing.

In 1949, Eddy de Wind, a Dutch psychiatrist and survivor of Auschwitz concentration camp, introduced the term "concentration camp syndrome" regarding the psychological consequences of persecution, describing the "pathological after-effects" unique to former prisoners of Nazi concentration and extermination camps. The subsequently well-documented syndrome among Holocaust survivors includes anxiety and depression, intellectual impairment, social withdrawal, sleep disturbance and nightmares, physical complaints and mood swings with loss of drive. Several studies have examined the "chronic and progressive" nature of the condition, with symptoms increasing in intensity as survivors age.

Commonly such survivors feel guilty that they have survived the trauma and others – such as their family, friends, and colleagues – did not.

Both conditions, along with other descriptive syndromes covering a range of traumatic events are now subsumed under post-traumatic stress disorder.

AIDS survivor syndrome
AIDS survivor syndrome refers to the psychological effects of living with the long-term trajectory of the AIDS epidemic and includes survivor's guilt, depression, and feelings of being forgotten in contemporary discussions concerning HIV. While AIDS survivor syndrome has not been recognized as a pathologizable illness by the NIH, scientific research and publications are available that address this issue.

Examples

Waylon Jennings 
Waylon Jennings was a guitarist for Buddy Holly's band and initially had a seat on the ill-fated aircraft on  February 3, 1959, "The day the music died". But Jennings gave up his seat to the sick J.P. "Big Bopper" Richardson, only to learn later of the plane's crash. When Holly learned that Jennings was not going to fly, he said, "Well, I hope your ol' bus freezes up." Jennings responded, "Well, I hope your ol' plane crashes." This exchange of words, though made in jest at the time, haunted Jennings for the rest of his life.

Stoneman Douglas High School shooting 

On February 14, 2018, Sydney Aiello survived the Stoneman Douglas High School shooting, in which her close friend was killed.  Aiello subsequently struggled with survivor's guilt, and was later diagnosed with post-traumatic stress disorder. On March 17, 2019, Aiello died by suicide at the age of 19. Less than a week later, on March 23, 2019, Coral Springs police announced that Calvin Desir, a juvenile male student from Stoneman Douglas High School had been found dead as a result of an apparent suicide.

Stephen Whittle 

Stephen Whittle was a Liverpool fan who had bought a ticket for the FA Cup semi-final between Liverpool and Nottingham Forest on 15 April 1989, but sold his ticket to a friend due to work reasons. The friend (whom he and his family have left unidentified) was one of the 97 victims of the human crush at that game. Whittle subsequently developed survivor guilt, becoming unable to go to football matches due to his guilt and related feeling of responsibility for his friend's death, and died by suicide on 26 February 2011, almost 22 years after the ill-fated match.

See also
 Miklos Kanitz
 Post-traumatic stress disorder
 Stockholm syndrome
 Survivors' Staircase
 Survivorship bias

References

Further reading
Encyclopedia of Stress, Academic Press; 1st edition (April 2000)
Diagnostic and Statistical Manual of Mental Disorders IV, American Psychiatric Publishing; 4th edition (June 2000)

Symptoms and signs of mental disorders
Post-traumatic stress disorder
Aftermath of war
Guilt